Metogest (INN, USAN) (developmental code name SC-14207), also known as 16,16-dimethyl-19-nortestosterone, is a steroidal antiandrogen that was patented in 1975 and investigated as a treatment for acne but was never marketed.

See also
 Steroidal antiandrogen
 List of steroidal antiandrogens

References

Anti-acne preparations
Estranes
Steroidal antiandrogens